Kadappooru is a village in Kottayam district, Kerala, India. It is strategically located 3 Kilometers off from Ettumanoor - Pala Road (deviated at Koodalloor Kavala Jn), 5 km off from Cochin - Kottayam Road (deviated at Vempally Jn) and 18 km from Kottayam town.

Economy
Kadappoor has paddy fields, natural rubber plantations and other agricultural products. Kattachira thodu, a small river flows near Kadappoor rejoins at Kattachira with Meenachil River. Kadappoor is blessed with an ancient temple(കടപ്പൂര് ദേവിക്ഷേത്രം), Government Higher Secondary School and a Catholic church. The temple is of goddess kali. It's a very ancient temple which is believed to be constructed by lord Parasurama.

Administration
This village is situated in Kanakkary Panchayath and belongs to Kaduthuruthy legislative constituency and nearby villages are Koodalloor, Vempally, Kattachira and Clamattom.

Festivals
The people of kadappooru have the only privilege to carry the ship during the MOONU NOMPU at St.Mary's Church Parish Kuravilangadu. This custom is started from the 400A.D.

References

Villages in Kottayam district